The Marshall Islands competed at the 2015 Pacific Games in Port Moresby, Papua New Guinea from 4 to 18 July 2015. The Marshall Islands listed 10 competitors as of 4 July 2015.

Athletics

Marshall Islands qualified one athlete in track and field:

Men
 Jeki Lanki

Beach volleyball

Marshall Islands qualified a women's beach volleyball team (3 athletes):

Women
 Angelina John 
 Carolyn Hone 
 Darcyann Muller

Swimming

Marshall Islands qualified three athletes in swimming:

Women
 Ann-Marie Hepler
 Colleen Furgeson

Men
 Giordan Harris

Taekwondo

Marshall Islands qualified one athlete in taekwondo:

Men
 Jason Sam

Weightlifting

Marshall Islands qualified two athletes in weightlifting:

Women
 Mathlynn Robert 

Men
 Kabuati Bob

References

Pac
Nations at the 2015 Pacific Games
Marshall Islands at the Pacific Games